The 1932 UCLA Bruins football team was an American football team that represented the University of California, Los Angeles in the Pacific Coast Conference (PCC) during the 1932 college football season.  In their eighth year under head coach William H. Spaulding, the Bruins compiled a 6–4 record (4–2 conference), finished third in the PCC, and outscored opponents by a total of 149 to 61.

Schedule

References

UCLA
UCLA Bruins football seasons
UCLA Bruins football